Matrudevobhava (Telugu: మాతృదేవోభవ) was an Indian Telugu language soap opera starring Pravallika, Raja Sridhar, and Sainath as the main protagonists and Srilakshmi, Nalini, Mounika, and Ravikanth in pivotal roles. The serial aired on Gemini TV from 30 October 2017 to 30 November 2019 every Monday to Saturday at 12:30 PM IST for 553 episodes.

Cast
Pravallika as Krishnaveni
Raja Sridhar as Arjun prasad, Krishnaveni's husband
Sainath as Vijay
Rishika as Meghana
Srilakshmi as Gayatri devi, Arjun's mother
C.H Krishnaveni as Vijay's grand mother
Aditya as venkat, Meghana's father
Uma Shankar as Harish
Sameera as Harish wife
divya deepika as karthik's sister in law

Former cast
Ravi Kiran as Karthik
Mounica as Kavya
Nalini as Karthik's mother
Bharani shankar
Lireesha
divya deepika

Airing history
The serial started airing on Gemini TV on 30 October 2017. It aired on Monday to Friday 8:00PM IST. Later, a serial named Maya replaced this show at 8:00PM and pushed this serial to 2:30PM IST. Again it was shifted to 12:30PM from 30 September 2019. The serial ended on 30 November 2019 after airing 553 episodes.

Awards and nominations

References

Indian television soap operas
Telugu-language television shows
2017 Indian television series debuts
Gemini TV original programming